Mrs. Caliban (1982) is a novella by Rachel Ingalls.  The plot concerns a lonely housewife who finds companionship with an amphibious sea monster named Larry. The book was reissued in 2017.

Reception
The novella saw little critical or commercial success upon release until 1986, when it was named by the British Book Marketing Council as one of the top 20 American novels of the post-World War II period.

The novella has received praise from notable authors Ursula K. Le Guin, Joyce Carol Oates, Daniel Handler, and Eleanor Catton. The author John Updike praises the book for being "So deft and austere in its prose, so drolly casual in its fantasy. . . . An impeccable parable, beautifully written from first paragraph to last."

References

1982 American novels

Fiction about monsters